Marc Ferré Nazzaro (born 11 January 1994) is an Andorran international footballer who plays for FC Andorra as a midfielder.

Career
Born in Andorra la Vella, Ferré has played club football for FC Andorra.

He made his international debut for Andorra in 2018.

References

1994 births
Living people
Andorran footballers
Andorra international footballers
FC Andorra players
Association football midfielders